The principality of Jersika (also known as Лотыголa) was an early medieval Latgalian principality in eastern modern-day Latvia and one of the largest early states in Latvia before the Northern Crusades.

History 
Jersika was established in the 10th century as an outpost of the principality of Polotsk on the old "trade route from the Varangians to the Greeks". It was ruled by Eastern Orthodox Christian princes from the Latgalian-Polotsk branch of the Rurik Dynasty.

In 1209, Visvaldis, the prince of Jersika, was defeated by bishop Albert of Riga and the Livonian Brothers of the Sword, and his Lithuanian wife was taken prisoner. He was forced to submit his kingdom to Albert as a grant to the Bishopric of Riga, and received back only a portion of it as a fief. He lost lands of Autīne and Cesvaine, but retained Jersika, Mākoņkalns and Naujiene. Visvaldis' feudal charter is the oldest such document surviving in Latvia, and in this charter, Visvaldis is called "the king of Jersika" ("Vissewalde, rex de Gercike", in another document also "Wiscewolodus rex de Berzika").

In 1211, the part of Jersika controlled by Albert which was known as "Lettia" ("terra, quae Lettia dicitur") was divided between the bishopric of Riga and the Livonian Brothers of the Sword. In 1212, Polotsk gave up its tributary rights over Jersika in favor of Bishop Albert. In 1214, Germans attacked the Castle of Jersika and sacked it. Baltic German Uexküll family claimed that Conrad Uexküll had married the daughter of Visvaldis.

After the death of Visvaldis in 1239, his fief passed to the Livonian Order, but this was repeatedly contested by the rulers of Lithuania and Novgorod, who periodically sought to conquer the territory.

References

1239 disestablishments in Europe
13th century in Latvia
Former principalities
Archaeological sites in Latvia
States and territories established in the 10th century
Historical regions in Latvia
Russians in Latvia
Medieval Latvia
Subdivisions of Kievan Rus'